The Georgia Avenue–Maryland Line, designated Route Y2, Y7, Y8, is a daily bus route operated by the Washington Metropolitan Area Transit Authority between Silver Spring station of the Red Line of the Washington Metro and MedStar Montgomery Medical Center in Olney (Y2, Y8) or the Georgia Ave – ICC Park & Ride Lot (Y7). The line operates every 20 minutes during the weekday peak hour and weekend late nights, 30 minutes all other times on weekdays, and 40–45 minutes on weekends. Y2 trips are roughly 55 minutes long, Y7 trips are roughly 62 minutes long, and Y8 trips are roughly 70 minutes long. This route provides service along Georgia Avenue in Maryland providing service to multiple communities.

Background

Routes Y2, Y7, and Y8 operate along Georgia Avenue providing frequent service to multiple communities. Route Y2 operates daily as a direct service between Silver Spring station and MedStar Montgomery Medical Center, skipping both the ICC Park & Ride lot and the Leisure World clubhouse. Route Y7 operates on weekdays only via the Leisure World clubhouse but instead terminates at the ICC Park & Ride lot instead of MedStar Montgomery Medical Center. Route Y8 operates daily on the same Y2 routing but serves the Leisure World clubhouse. Routes Y7 and Y8 only operate between 6:00 AM and 8:00 PM when the Leisure World clubhouse is open while route Y2 rarely operates between those hours on weekdays (it runs all day on weekends).

Routes Y2, Y7, and Y8 operate out of Montgomery division. It often uses articulated buses due to its high ridership volume.

Route Stops

History
The line originally operated under former streetcar lines prior to becoming buses in 1973. During Metro's inception, routes Y2 and Y4 operated between Silver Spring station and Kensington before being replaced by Ride On through the 1980s-1990s. Then route Y4 operated between Rockville and Glenmont station before being replaced by Ride On route 49 in 1998. Route Y1 operated between Montgomery Village and Potomac Park. Route Y3 originally operated between Leisure World and Southwest Mall, then became a part of the Homecrest-Wheaton Line. Both the Y1 and Y3 were later discontinued around the 1990s and replaced by Ride On routes.

The original Georgia Avenue–Maryland Line operated as routes Y5, Y6, Y7, Y8, and Y9. At one point during its inception, route Y5 would operate between Leisure World to Federal Triangle, then operate as part of the Norbeck–Wheaton Line until the 1990s when it was replaced by Ride On route 48. Route Y5 would later join the Georgia Avenue–Maryland Line. Route Y6 operated between Glenmont and Wheaton before being extended to Aspen Hill. Route Y7 would operate between Montgomery Village and Southwest Mall. Routes Y8 and Y9 would only operate between MedStar Montgomery Medical Center and Silver Spring. All routes would primarily operate along Georgia Avenue.

During the 1980 to 1990s, routes Y5, and Y7 were rerouted to operate with routes Y8 and Y9 MedStar Montgomery Hospital and Silver Spring. Y6 would also join the line but would keep its same routing between Glenmont and Aspen Hill.

1990s
In the 1990s, route Y6 was renamed route Q3 which would operate on its same routing. The route was later replaced by Ride On route 41 in 1998.

Y5 was also eliminated and replaced by routes Y7, Y8, and Y9.

Since the 1990s, the Georgia Avenue–Maryland Line operates as the following:
 Y7: Rockville station to Silver Spring station via the Norbeck Park and Ride. Trips to Rockville are only served during peak hours.
 Y8: Montgomery General Hospital to Silver Spring via Leisure World only.
 Y9: Montgomery General Hospital to Wheaton as a direct route.

2003 Changes

June
On June 29, 2003, WMATA made changes to the line where all trips will operate between Montgomery General Hospital and Silver Spring station. Trips passing Leisure World Clubhouse were named route Y9 while trips serving the clubhouse were named route Y8. The Norbeck Park & Ride Lot will be served directly only by southbound trips in the morning rush and by northbound trips in the afternoon rush as route Y7 which was extended to the Montgomery General Hospital. Route Y7 trips to Rockville station were eliminated with all trips terminating at the Norbeck Park and Ride lot.

At the time, routes Y7 and Y9 did not serve Silver Spring station making route Y8 the only route to serve Silver Spring. Route Y7 and Y8 operate daily while route Y9 operated during the weekday peak hours only.

September
On September 7, 2003, Leisure World Clubhouse requested that on weekdays, the number of trips diverting off of Georgia Avenue to serve clubhouse directly be significantly reduced. Route Y8 trips not diverting into the clubhouse were named route Y9 and half of Y7 trips will no longer serve the clubhouse. Existing route Y7 trips serving the clubhouse were named route Y5. The changes goes as follows:

All Y5 and Y7 trips will serve the Norbeck Park & Ride Lot.
All Y5 and Y8 trips will serve Leisure World
All Y8 trips will serve Leisure World, but not the Norbeck Park & Ride Lot
All Y9 trips will serve neither. The times that most weekday trips pass stops south of Leisure World will not change.

2011 Changes
On December 18, 2011, new service was added to the new Intercounty Connector Park and Ride Lot off Georgia Avenue. Routes Y5 and Y7 would enter the Park and Ride in order for passengers to transfer to MTA Maryland 201 and 202. Service to the Norbeck Park & Ride Lot was discontinued.

2012 Study

Between 2011 and 2012, WMATA released a study on the Y lines. At the time, the Y line was suffering from insufficient run time, inconvenient service frequencies, and operational issues the line has. Proposals were to simplify the line, add time to schedule buses, combine bus stops together, improve amenities at bus stops, and convert route Y9 as a MetroExtra route. These changes will go under short to long term plans.

At the time of the study, frequencies goes as the following:
 Y5: Weekday Peak Hour service (AM to Silver Spring, PM to Olney) and Sunday service only.
 Y7: Weekday Peak Hour service (AM to Silver Spring, PM to Olney) and late night Saturday service only.
 Y8: Daily (except service in the Weekday Peak direction). Most Saturday service only operates between SIlver Spring and Leisure World.
 Y9: Daily direct between Silver Spring and Olney. Most Sunday trips only operates between Medstar Montgomery Medical Center and Wheaton station.

August 2014 Changes
On August 24, 2014, routes Y5 and Y9 were discontinued by WMATA and replaced by routes Y7 and Y8 in order to simplify the Georgia Avenue–Maryland Line. Route Y7 would also be shortened and rerouted to Georgia Ave–ICC Park & Ride Lot instead of MedStar Hospital while route Y8 would discontinue service to the Leisure World clubhouse remaining straight along Georgia Avenue. During the weekends, route Y7 would only operate between Leisure World clubhouse and Wheaton station.

Temporary Y4
Between October 14, 2014 and December 12, 2014, a temporary route Y4 was introduced as the Leisure World–Olney Line running on weekdays between 8:00 AM and 3:00 PM in order to provide residents access to the Leisure World clubhouse from Olney. This was because residents lost direct access to the clubhouse on August 24, 2014 when the Y8 became a direct route. Passengers would have to walk from the clubhouse onto Georgia Avenue to take the Y8 instead of waiting at the bus stops as the Y7 would take them to Silver Spring or up to the Georgia Ave–ICC Park & Ride Lot on weekdays only.

December 2014 Changes
On December 14, 2014, a new route Y2 was introduced to operate a direct routing between MedStar Montgomery Medical Center and Silver Spring station which was the Y8 routing and former Y9 routing. Route Y8 was also rerouted back to the Leisure World clubhouse but discontinued all weekend service. Route Y4 was also discontinued as there was no need for the route to operate anymore as the Y8 covered the same routing. These changes were all towards customer feedback and frustration due to the August 24 changes.

September 2015 Changes
When the Paul S. Sarbanes Transit Center at Silver Spring station opened, routes Y2, Y7, and Y8 were rerouted from its terminus along Wayne Avenue to the new transit center. The Y2, Y7, and Y8 were assigned to Bus Bay 219 on level 2.

June 2017 Changes
On June 25, 2017, weekend route Y8 service was restored operating its full route. Route Y7 also discontinued weekend service on the same day being replaced by routes Y2 and Y8. This gives residents from Olney weekend service to the Leisure World clubhouse which has not happened since the 2014 changes.

December 2017 Changes
On December 17, 2017, northbound buses which departed from Wheaton station will operate via Veirs Mill Road, University Boulevard, Grandview Avenue, and Blueridge Avenue to access Georgia Avenue due to closure of Reedie Drive. Northbound service on Reedie Drive, and Georgia Avenue between Reedie Drive and Blueridge Avenue will be eliminated.

Incidents
 On October 11, 2011, 52-year old Victor McEachin stabbed a Y7 bus driver at Wheaton station after he allegedly had inappropriate sexual behavior on board the bus. After a 26 year old women reported the incident to the driver, the driver told the man to respect other passengers, then began talking in a loud manner. After arriving at Wheaton station, the driver got off and McEachin began attacking the driver and the 26 year old woman. McEachin then attempted to punch the woman, then got into a physical altercation and stabbed the driver. The suspect later fled the scene but was later arrested nearby University Boulevard West and Amherst Avenue. The driver suffered minor injuries. McEachin was later convicted on May 2, 2012.
 On May 11, 2020 around 9:30 PM, a passenger threatened a Y2 bus driver which caused the driver to be distracted and serve along Georgia Avenue and struck a sign on a Church lawn. No series injuries were reported and it's unknown if any arrests were made.

References

Y2
Transportation in Montgomery County, Maryland